Batavia is a village in and the county seat of Clermont County, Ohio, United States. The population was 1,509 at the 2010 census.

Geography

Batavia is located at  (39.077332, -84.179160).

It is surrounded by Batavia Township.

Transportation
Batavia is on Ohio State Route 32, also known as the Appalachian Highway, a major east–west highway that connects Interstate 275 and the Cincinnati area to the rural counties of Southern Ohio. State Routes Ohio State Route 132 and 222 also pass through Batavia's downtown area.

The Clermont Transportation Connection provides daily bus service to downtown Cincinnati. The Cincinnati Eastern Railroad (CCET) passes through Batavia.

History

Batavia was surveyed on May 28, 1788, by Captain Francis Minnis, John O'Bannon, Nicholas Keller, Archelus Price, and John Ormsley. Virginian Ezekiel Dimmitt became the area's first settler in the fall of 1797. George Ely purchased the Minnis survey in 1807 and platted the town on October 24, 1814, possibly naming it after Batavia, New York. The Clermont County seat moved from New Richmond to Batavia on February 24, 1824. Batavia finally incorporated as a village on February 10, 1842.

The Norfolk and Western Railway stopped at Batavia from March 1877 to April 1971. The Cincinnati, Georgetown and Portsmouth Railroad, an interurban railroad, also ran through town from 1903 to 1934. Norfolk Southern can sometimes roll through Batavia about 3 times a day.

Demographics

2010 census
As of the census of 2010, there were 1,509 people, 629 households, and 411 families living in the village. The racial makeup of the village was 93.6% White, 3.4% African American, 0.5% Native American, 0.6% Asian, 0.1% from other races, and 1.8% from two or more races. Hispanic or Latino of any race were 0.9% of the population.

There were 629 households, of which 31.3% had children under the age of 18 living with them, 43.7% were married couples living together, 16.7% had a female householder with no husband present, 4.9% had a male householder with no wife present, and 34.7% were non-families. 30.8% of all households were made up of individuals, and 9.7% had someone living alone who was 65 years of age or older. The average household size was 2.37 and the average family size was 2.91.

The median age in the village was 37.7 years. 24.5% of residents were under the age of 18; 8.3% were between the ages of 18 and 24; 26.5% were from 25 to 44; 27.3% were from 45 to 64; and 13.5% were 65 years of age or older. The gender makeup of the village was 47.1% male and 52.9% female.

2000 census
As of the census of 2000, there were 1,617 people, 651 households, and 453 families living in the village. The population density was 1,105.4 people per square mile (427.6/km). There were 696 housing units at an average density of 475.8 per square mile (184.1/km). The racial makeup of the village was 94.50% White, 3.28% African American, 0.12% Native American, 0.25% Asian, 0.06% Pacific Islander, 0.25% from other races, and 1.55% from two or more races. Hispanic or Latino of any race were 0.37% of the population.

There were 651 households, out of which 34.4% had children under the age of 18 living with them, 52.2% were married couples living together, 13.8% had a female householder with no husband present, and 30.3% were non-families. 25.7% of all households were made up of individuals, and 9.4% had someone living alone who was 65 years of age or older. The average household size was 2.48 and the average family size was 2.96.

In the village, the age distribution of the population shows 25.9% under the age of 18, 8.4% from 18 to 24, 30.2% from 25 to 44, 23.3% from 45 to 64, and 12.3% who were 65 years of age or older. The median age was 36 years. For every 100 females there were 97.2 males. For every 100 females age 18 and over, there were 92.5 males.

The median income for a household in the village was $40,804, and the median income for a family was $50,238. Males had a median income of $36,190 versus $25,583 for females. The per capita income for the village was $20,171. About 6.4% of families and 6.6% of the population were below the poverty line, including 8.4% of those under age 18 and none of those age 65 or over.

Economy
Batavia was home to Ford Motor Company's Batavia Transmission plant until it closed in 2009 under a corporate plan called "The Way Forward". Batavia anchored an industrial area that also includes rollercoaster manufacturer Clermont Steel Fabricators.

Education

University of Cincinnati Clermont College, a regional campus of the University of Cincinnati, is in Batavia. UC Clermont's satellite campus, UC East, operates out of the administrative offices of the former Ford plant. Due to declining enrollment at UC Clermont, UC East was closed and is vacated as of 2020.

Batavia and the surrounding township belongs to the Batavia Local School District. The village annexed its only high school, Batavia High School, in 2012.

Batavia has a public library, a branch of the Clermont County Public Library.

Media and attractions
WOBO-FM broadcasts from Batavia at 88.7 MHz. The Clermont Sun has published weekly since 1828. The Tri-State Warbird Museum is located at the Clermont County Airport.

Notable people
The following notable people have lived in Batavia:
Audrey Bolte – beauty queen, 2012 Miss Ohio USA
Charlie Case – baseball player, Pittsburgh Pirates
Reader W. Clarke – lawyer, Whig newspaper publisher, and Republican member of the U.S. House of Representatives
Lieutenant General Henry Clark Corbin – Army officer, Adjutant General of the U.S. Army
William Howard – soldier, lawyer, and Democratic member of the U.S. House of Representatives
George W. Hulick – teacher, lawyer, soldier, judge, and Republican member of the U.S. House of Representatives
Josephine Johnson – novelist, 1935 Pulitzer Prize for Fiction winner
Charles Cyrus Kearns – lawyer, Republican member of the U.S. House of Representatives
Staff Sergent Keith Matthew Maupin – Army soldier captured in Iraq in 2004, whose death was not confirmed until 2008
Jonathan D. Morris – lawyer, Democratic member of the U.S. House of Representatives
Earl Mossor – baseball player, Brooklyn Dodgers
Bill Mussey – journalist and Republican member of the Ohio General Assembly
Hugh L. Nichols – politician and judge, Lieutenant Governor of Ohio and Chief Justice of the Ohio Supreme Court
Joel Peckham – poet
Julius Penn  – U.S. Army brigadier general in World War I
Gene Schott – baseball player, Cincinnati Reds
Joe Smith – baseball player, Houston Astros
Philip Bergen Swing – United States federal judge, S.D. Ohio
Murray Thurston Titus – Christian missionary to India

References

External links

Village website

County seats in Ohio
Villages in Clermont County, Ohio
Villages in Ohio
Populated places established in 1797